Brundtland is a surname. Notable people with the surname include:

 Gro Harlem Brundtland (born 1939), Norwegian politician, diplomat, physician, and international leader in sustainable development and public health
 Torbjørn Brundtland (born 1975), member of the duo Röyksopp

See also 
 Brundtland Commission, formally the World Commission on Environment and Development (WCED), convened by the United Nations in 1983
 First cabinet Brundtland, minority Labour Government of Norway
 Second cabinet Brundtland, minority Labour Government of Norway
 Third cabinet Brundtland, minority Labour Government of Norway